Richard Evans (born 30 March 1945, Wilmslow, Cheshire, England) is a graphic designer, art director and illustrator. He studied fashion and textile design at Nottingham School of Art and graphic design and illustration at Leicester College of Art.

On leaving art school in 1968, he began what was to be a brief career as a fashion illustrator, mainly for teen magazines Petticoat and Honey, published by Fleetway Publications. In 1971 he formed fashion footwear company Daisy Roots Shoes with a showroom in Beauchamp Place, Knightsbridge, London and a retail outlet in Harrods Way In boutique, designing and producing high fashion footwear for the hip rock generation featuring stacked heel and platform shoes and boots in brightly coloured leathers and exotic reptile skin. His footwear was favoured by the likes of Elton John, George Harrison, The Osmonds, Roxy Music, Redbone and Irish blues guitarist Rory Gallagher.

He then worked as a graphic designer and illustrator in the mid- to late-1970s at seminal design studio Hipgnosis with Storm Thorgerson and Aubrey Powell, designers of many classic rock album covers for Pink Floyd, Paul McCartney and Wings, Led Zeppelin, Peter Gabriel, Bad Company, 10cc, Genesis, Black Sabbath and many others.

Richard Evans has produced album covers and designs for many artistes including The Doors, Public Image Limited, Pete Townshend, Nik Kershaw, Robert Plant, Alison Krauss, Black Sabbath, Judas Priest, Pink Floyd, Paul McCartney, Godley & Creme, Deep Purple, Roger Daltrey, World Party, Scorpions, King Sunny Adé, Bill Wyman, Louis Armstrong and Van Morrison, plus designs for a diverse range of musical genres.

He is mostly known for his design work for The Who, with whom he has worked since 1976, including the cover for Endless Wire (2006) and The Who's 50th anniversary tour logo and album The Who Hits 50! (2015). His design for The Who Sell Out Super Deluxe Edition box set won the Best CD Deluxe Set in the Making Vinyl Packaging Awards (2021).

Richard Evans is the author of The Art of the Album Cover, published by Chartwell Books.

References

External links
 Richard Evans' official website
 Richard Evans at Hypergallery
The Independent: The album covers that made it hip to be square
 AIGA Design Archives
 Artist Direct

1945 births
Living people
English designers
English graphic designers
Album-cover and concert-poster artists
People from Wilmslow
Alumni of Nottingham School of Art